Cristle Collins Judd is an American academic administrator and musicologist serving as the 11th president of Sarah Lawrence College.

Early life and education 
Judd is originally from Texas, and earned her bachelor's degree in music performance from the Shepherd School of Music at Rice University. She earned her master's degree and PhD from King's College London with a dissertation on the 16th century Italian composer and theorist, Gioseffo Zarlino.

Career 
Judd began her career in academics at the University of Melbourne, and later held a role at the University of Exeter. In 1993, Judd became a faculty member at the University of Pennsylvania. She later served dean for academic affairs and professor of music at Bowdoin College. Prior to taking office as president of Sarah Lawrence, Judd worked at the Andrew W. Mellon Foundation, where she was a senior program officer for Higher Education and Scholarship in the Humanities.

See also 
 List of presidents of Sarah Lawrence College

References

Living people
American academic administrators
Heads of universities and colleges in the United States
Rice University alumni
Year of birth missing (living people)